Marion Township is one of the ten townships of Fayette County, Ohio, United States. As of the 2010 census the population was 766, of whom 655 lived in the unincorporated portions of the township.

Geography
Located in the eastern part of the county, it borders the following townships:
Madison Township - north
Perry Township, Pickaway County - east
Deerfield Township, Ross County - southeast corner
Wayne Township - south
Union Township - southwest
Paint Township - northwest

Part of the village of New Holland is located in eastern Marion Township.

Name and history
Marion Township was established on July 18, 1840, from land given by Madison Township.

It is one of twelve Marion Townships statewide.

Government
The township is governed by a three-member board of trustees, who are elected in November of odd-numbered years to a four-year term beginning on the following January 1. Two are elected in the year after the presidential election and one is elected in the year before it. There is also an elected township fiscal officer, who serves a four-year term beginning on April 1 of the year after the election, which is held in November of the year before the presidential election. Vacancies in the fiscal officership or on the board of trustees are filled by the remaining trustees.

References

External links
County website

Townships in Fayette County, Ohio
Townships in Ohio